Francis Christian Cabrel (born 23 November 1953) is a French singer-songwriter, composer and guitarist. Considered one of the most influential French musical artists of all time, he has released a number of albums falling mostly within the realm of folk, with occasional forays into blues or country. Several of his songs, such as "L'encre de tes yeux", "Je l'aime à mourir", "Le chêne liège" and "La corrida", have become enduring favourites in French music. Since the start of his career, Cabrel has sold over 25 million albums.

His first hit song was "Petite Marie" in 1974, which was about the woman who soon became his wife, Mariette. His song "Je l'aime à mourir" was covered by Shakira; this version, both sung in French and Spanish, became a major hit single. An unauthorised biography was published in 2015. Cabrel, who is one of the most private French singers, attempted to have the book suppressed.

Biography
Francis Cabrel was born in Agen, Lot-et-Garonne into a modest family of Veneto
descend. His father was a labourer in a biscuit factory and his mother a cashier in a cafeteria. He has a sister, Martine, and a brother, Philippe. He spent his childhood in Astaffort, in Lot-et-Garonne.

Albums

Studio albums

Live albums

Compilation albums

Box sets

Singles

As lead artist

As featured artist

Other charted songs

Videography
 Sarbacane tour (1989)

Footnotes

References

External links
 Official Francis Cabrel website
Biography of Francis Cabrel, from Radio France Internationale

1953 births
Living people
People from Agen
French people of Italian descent
French male singers
French singer-songwriters
French folk music
Columbia Records artists
Spanish-language singers of France
French male singer-songwriters